The 1907 Kansas Jayhawks football team was an American football that represented the University of Kansas as a member of the Missouri Valley Conference (MVC) during the 1907 college football season. In their fourth season under head coach A. R. Kennedy, the Jayhawks compiled a 5–3 record (1–1 against conference opponents), finished in third place in the MVC, and outscored opponents by a total of 111 to 57. The Jayhawks played their home games at McCook Field in Lawrence, Kansas. Carl Rouse was the team captain.

Schedule

References

Kansas
Kansas Jayhawks football seasons
Kansas Jayhawks football